Roland Aloysius Madden, an American meteorologist, was a staff scientist at the National Center for Atmospheric Research (NCAR) from 1967 to 2002. His research centers on diagnostic studies of the atmosphere. Madden is a fellow of the American Meteorological Society (AMS) and a recipient of the 2002 Jule G. Charney Award of the AMS.

Biography 
Madden was born on May 8, 1938 in Chicago, Illinois.  He grew up in Edison Park in northwest Chicago and attended St. Juliana’s Grammar School and Fenwick High School
He received his Bachelor of Science degree in physics from Loyola University Chicago in 1961.
  That same year, he joined the United States Air Force where he served for four years as Duty Forecaster at Patrick Air Force Base and Assistant Staff Meteorologist at Cape Canaveral.  He received his master’s and doctoral degrees in meteorology from the University of Chicago in 1967  and Colorado State University in 1978 respectively.  In 1967, he was appointed staff scientist at the National Center for Atmospheric Research in Boulder Colorado where he worked for 35 years, most recently as a member of the Climate Analysis Section in the Climate and Global Dynamics Division.  Madden spent periods of time as an invited scientist at a variety of institutions, including the Scripps Institute of Oceanography, Free University of Berlin, Naval Postgraduate School, University of Stockholm, Max Planck Institute for Meteorology, the New Zealand National Institute of Water and Atmospheric Research, and Monash University in Melbourne, Australia.  Madden retired from NCAR in 2002.  He was married to Mary Agnes (née Ruh) Madden (1939–2019) for fifty-seven years, and the couple has four children.

Career highlights 
Over the course of his career, Madden authored over 100 research publications, technical reports, and proceedings. He is perhaps best known for his discovery in 1971 with Paul Julian of the Madden–Julian oscillation (MJO) and the comprehensive description of the phenomenon in 1972.  The MJO is an eastward moving atmospheric disturbance that traverses the planet in the tropics with a period of 30–60 days, on average.    The MJO is the main intra-seasonal fluctuation explaining weather in the tropics, and it continues to be studied broadly.
 
Selected areas of important contributions (and related publications) in addition to the MJO include:
 The first estimates of the composition of cloud clusters in the Global Atmospheric Research Program (GARP) Atlantic Tropical Experiment (GATE) area;
 The introduction of an analysis of variance approach to estimate the potential long-range predictability of pressure, temperature, and precipitation;
 The first estimates of the time of emergence of warming due to increased atmospheric carbon dioxide;
 The first estimates relating MJO tropical wind stress and the rotation of the earth;
 The first quantitative measures of the effects of imperfect spatial and temporal sampling on estimates of the global mean temperature; and
 The first comprehensive quantitative estimates of the effect of aliasing.

Madden continues to work and publish as an NCAR Senior Scientist Emeritus.  His most recent publication presents new evidence of the Rossby-Haurwitz waves and appeared in 2019.

Selected publications

References 

1938 births
Living people
Fellows of the American Meteorological Society
Scientists from Chicago
Military personnel from Illinois
Loyola University Chicago alumni
University of Chicago alumni
Colorado State University alumni
American meteorologists
National Center for Atmospheric Research faculty